Pawelczyk is a surname. Notable people with the surname include:

 Alfons Pawelczyk (born 1933), German politician
 Irena Pawełczyk (born 1934), Polish luger
 James A. Pawelczyk (born 1960), American astronaut